The Philippines competed at the 1988 Winter Olympics in Calgary, Canada. The nation returned after a 16-year absence since they last competed at the 1972 Winter Olympics in Sapporo, Japan.

Competitors
The following is the list of number of competitors in the Games.

Alpine skiing

Michael Teruel qualified but did not compete.

Luge

Men

References

Official Olympic Reports
 Olympic Winter Games 1988, full results by sports-reference.com

Nations at the 1988 Winter Olympics
1988
Winter Olympics